The poplar petiole gall moth (Ectoedemia populella) is a moth of the family Nepticulidae. It is widely distributed in North America east of the Rocky Mountains. It was first described by Danish-American entomologist August Busck in 1907.

The adult wingspan 7-8.5 mm.

The larvae induce globular galls on the petioles of several Populus species. Mature larvae overwinter in the galls and adults emerge in spring.

External links
Nepticulidae of North America
A Taxonomic Revision Of The Western Palaearctic Species Of The Subgenera Zimmermannia Hering And Ectoedemia Busck s.str. (Lepidoptera, Nepticulidae), With Notes On Their Phylogeny

References 

Nepticulidae
Moths of North America

Gall-inducing insects
Moths described in 1907